Kühren-Burkartshain is a former municipality in the former district Muldentalkreis, Saxony. It was formed in 1994 by the merger of the municipalities Kühren and Burkartshain. In October 2006, it was merged into the town Wurzen.

Former municipalities in Saxony
Wurzen